Antonio "Toni" Martínez López (born 30 June 1997) is a Spanish professional footballer who plays as a forward for Primeira Liga club Porto. He has represented Spain internationally at youth level.

Martínez began his senior career at Valencia Mestalla, before joining West Ham United in 2016. He was loaned to several English and Spanish clubs, then signed for Famalicão in 2019. The following year, he joined Porto.

Club career

Valencia Mestalla
Born in Barrio del Progreso, Murcia, Martínez began his footballing career with local side C.F.S. El Progreso and later joined Real Murcia. In 2013, he signed for Valencia. Initially a member of the club's academy Cadete A team (for players aged 14–15 years), Martínez was soon admitted to their reserve side, Valencia Mestalla (Valencia B). He made his senior debut in the Segunda División B (third tier) at the age of 16, coming on as a substitute and scoring in a match against AE Prat on 8 December 2013.

In three seasons at Valencia Mestalla he played 16 games and scored two goals, and made a further eight appearances, a goal and three assists for the club's under-19 squad in the UEFA Youth League.

West Ham United

2016–17: Signing and Oxford loan
In April 2016, Martínez agreed a three-year deal to join English club West Ham United on 1 July 2016 for a fee of around £2.4 million. He was given permission to train with his new teammates by Valencia to help him settle in England and would initially link up with West Ham United's development squad. Martínez was given the number 29 shirt for the 2016–17 season.

He marked his Premier League 2 debut with a goal against Stoke City, in a 3–0 home win. After scoring seven goals in as many games for West Ham United U23 during the first half of the season, he suffered two injury set-backs; the first left him sidelined for six weeks with the player due to return to action on 21 November, but then suffered another injury. His prolific goal-scoring feats continued into January and before long he had racked up a total of 12 goals from 11 games.

On 23 January 2017, he was sent out on loan for the first time in his career, to League One side Oxford United until the end of the 2016–17 season. The player was handed the number 7 shirt by the club. On 28 January, Martínez came on as a substitute to score his first goal for the U's in a 3–0 home win over Newcastle United in the fourth round of the FA Cup. He made his league debut on 5 February in an away fixture against local rivals Swindon Town, a game which Oxford won 2–1, and scored his first league goal, a late consolation goal in a 3–2 home defeat at the hands of league leaders Sheffield United, on 7 March.

2017–18: Debut and Valladolid loan
On 7 January 2018, Martínez made his full West Ham debut in an FA Cup third round tie at Shrewsbury Town, replacing Javier Hernández after 71 minutes in a 0–0 draw. On 1 February, he made a deadline day loan switch to Spanish Segunda División club Real Valladolid for the remainder of the 2017–18 season. He contributed with one goal in ten appearances, as his side achieved promotion to La Liga in the play-offs.

2018–19: Rayo Majadahonda and Lugo loans
On 13 August 2018, Martínez joined CF Rayo Majadahonda still in Spain's second division, on loan for the season. He made his debut six days later on the opening weekend of the season against Real Zaragoza, Majadahonda's first game at this level. On as a second-half substitute for Enzo Fernández, he scored the club's first goal in the Segunda División, albeit in a 2–1 defeat.

On 18 January 2019, Martínez rescinded his loan deal with Majadahonda and moved to CD Lugo of the same league, on loan until June. On his debut eight days later, he scored the opener in a 3–2 home win against his former club.

He was released by West Ham on 1 July 2019, when his contract expired.

Famalicão
On 22 July 2019, Martínez joined F.C. Famalicão on a three-year contract. He made his debut on 3 August in the first round of the Taça da Liga, as a 59th-minute substitute for Pedro Gonçalves in a 2–0 home loss to S.C. Covilhã. A week later, in his team's first Primeira Liga match for a quarter of a century, he scored the first goal of the season in a 2–0 win at C.D. Santa Clara.

Martínez scored four goals in five games as Famalicão reached the semi-finals of the Taça de Portugal for the first time since 1946. All came in consecutive games, including one in each leg of a 4–3 aggregate elimination by S.L. Benfica in February 2020.

Porto
On 4 October 2020, Martínez joined Porto on a five-year contract. He won his first silverware on 23 December in the 2020 Supertaça Cândido de Oliveira, as a last-minute substitute in a 2–0 win over O Clássico rivals S.L. Benfica.

Martínez scored his first Porto goal on 21 November in a 2–0 cup win at G.D. Fabril, opening the score with a bicycle kick; his first league goal was in a 3–0 home win over Moreirense F.C. on 3 January 2021. On 14 February, he dropped into the reserve team in Liga Portugal 2 for a 2–1 loss to visitors U.D. Oliveirense, in which he scored after five minutes.

On 15 August 2021, Martínez scored both of Porto's goals in a 2–1 win on his return to Famalicão. He was sent off on 11 September in a 1–1 draw at Sporting CP for a foul on Sebastián Coates. On 17 February 2022, he scored both goals of a 2–1 home win over S.S. Lazio in the UEFA Europa League last 32; he played more often in the continental tournament as manager Sérgio Conceição prioritised other players for the league.

International career
Martínez played four matches for Spain U17, making his debut on 22 January 2014 against Italy.

In 2015, he received a call from Spain U19 to participate in the 2015 UEFA Under-19 Championship in Greece.

Career statistics

Honours
Porto
Primeira Liga: 2021–22
Taça de Portugal: 2021–22
Taça da Liga: 2022–23
Supertaça Cândido de Oliveira: 2020, 2022

Individual
Primeira Liga's Forward of the Month: August 2021

References

External links
Profile at the FC Porto website
Antonio Martínez at PremierLeague.com

1997 births
Living people
Footballers from Murcia
Spanish footballers
Association football forwards
Segunda División players
Segunda División B players
Real Murcia players
Valencia CF Mestalla footballers
Real Valladolid players
CF Rayo Majadahonda players
CD Lugo players
English Football League players
West Ham United F.C. players
Oxford United F.C. players
Primeira Liga players
F.C. Famalicão players
FC Porto players
FC Porto B players
Spain youth international footballers
Spanish expatriate footballers
Expatriate footballers in England
Spanish expatriate sportspeople in England
Expatriate footballers in Portugal
Spanish expatriate sportspeople in Portugal